Juan Luciano Pajuelo Chávez (born 23 September 1974) is a Peruvian football manager and former player who played as a defender.

Club career
Born in Lima, Pajuelo played for most of his career with Alianza Lima, Deportivo Municipal and Universitario de Deportes in the Primera División Peruana. He also had spells with Los Andes and Estudiantes de La Plata in the Primera División Argentina, Atlas in the Primera División de México and Ionikos in the Greek Super League.

International career
Pajuelo also made 25 appearances for the senior Peru national football team from 1999 to 2003.

Coaching career
In March 2014, Pajuelo was hired as an assistant manager for his former club Universitario. On 1 September 2015, manager Luis Fernando Suárez was fired and Pajuelo took over as a caretaker manager. It only lasted for some days, before Roberto Challe was hired.

Pajuelo left Universitario at the end of 2015, and became the manager of Atlético Torino for the 2016 season. He was fired on 19 May 2016 due to bad results.

In July 2018, he then became the manager of Comerciantes Unidos. He was fired again after two months. In January 2019, he returned to Universitario and was hired as the reserve team manager.

References

External links
 
 

1974 births
Living people
Footballers from Lima
Association football defenders
Peruvian footballers
Peru international footballers
2001 Copa América players
Peruvian Primera División players
Argentine Primera División players
Liga MX players
Super League Greece players
Club Alianza Lima footballers
Deportivo Municipal footballers
Club Universitario de Deportes footballers
Club Atlético Los Andes footballers
Atlas F.C. footballers
Estudiantes de La Plata footballers
Atlético Universidad footballers
Ionikos F.C. players
Juan Aurich footballers
Sport Boys footballers
José Gálvez FBC footballers
Peruvian expatriate footballers
Expatriate footballers in Argentina
Expatriate footballers in Greece
Expatriate footballers in Mexico
Club Universitario de Deportes managers
Deportivo Municipal managers